Two Autumns in París is a 2019 Venezuelan-Canadian drama film directed by Gibelys Coronado, based on a novel of the same name by writer Francisco Villarroel.

The film was premiered at the Bogotá Film Festival on October 16, 2019.  The film was shown for the first time in Venezuela, at the press conference of Miradas Diversas - 1er. Human Rights Film Festival, November 27, 2019. It was presented at the opening ceremony of the Guayaquil International Film Festival, on September 19, 2020.

It was the final screen performance of Venezuelan actor Raúl Amundaray, who had come out of retirement to play the character of the Ambassador.

Synopsis 

The movie tells the love story of Maria Teresa (María Antonieta Hidalgo) and Antonio (Slavko Sorman) when they were young. Many years later Antonio (Francisco Villarroel) arrives in Paris, facing memories of an unforgettable love that scarred him forever and changed the course of his life. He is in Paris to speak at a conference about human rights and in the journey from the airport to the event hall, he reconstructs his past romance with the beautiful Maria Teresa, a young Paraguayan, a political refugee who escaped from her country to save herself from the criminal repression of the dictatorship of the bloodthirsty general Alfredo Stroessner. In Paraguay, Maria Teresa was a member of a university student political group, opposed to the dictatorship, whose leader was her boyfriend Ramon. One night, when they were involved in a clandestine activity, they were detained by the regime's military police and locked in a prison. Maria Teresa and Antonio fell in love and even thought of having a child. They decided to live together, and Antonio changed his ways, María Teresa transformed him; in the end, she had to decide between her present love and her past.

Cast 
 María Antonieta Hidalgo as María Teresa
 Francisco Villarroel as Old Antonio
  Slavko Sorman as Young Antonio
 Raúl Amundaray as Ambassador
 Sonya Villamizar as Antonio's Mother
 Juan Belgrave as Oswaldo
 Alberto Rowinski as Don Manuel
 Jorge Melo as Jean Claude
 Ramón Roa as Captain Martinez

Awards 

The film was nominated for best picture at the Guayaquil International Film Festival, at the 13th edition of the Dominican Global Film Festival and at the 12nd edition of the Latinuy Latin Festival.

References

General bibliography 
 Giménez, Carlos (1983). "Film venezolano recrea el horror durante la dictadura paraguaya", in Periódico La Nación. Asunción, Paraguay, December 15, 2019.
 Ministerio del Poder Popular para la Comunicación y la Información (February 5, 2020). Venezuela participa en el Festival de Cine Global RD. Caracas.
 Villarroel Sneshko, Mary (August 21, 2020). "La película venezolana Dos Otoños en París lleva más de 80 premios internacionales", in Revista OceanDrive. Caracas.

External links 
 
 Two Autumns in Paris at filmaffinity
 Two Autumns in Paris at Rotten Tomatoes

2019 films
2019 drama films
Venezuelan drama films
Canadian drama films
2010s Canadian films
2010s Spanish-language films